The 1968 Campeonato Paulista da Divisão Especial de Futebol Profissional, organized by the Federação Paulista de Futebol, was the 67th season of São Paulo's top professional football league. Santos won the title for the 11th time. Comercial was relegated and the top scorer was Ferroviária's Téia with 20 goals.

Championship
The championship was disputed in a double-round robin system, with the team with the most points winning the title and the team with the fewest points being relegated.

Top Scores

References

Campeonato Paulista seasons
Paulista